Tripurasundari is an urban municipality located in Dolpa District of Karnali Province of Nepal.

The municipality is divided into total 11 wards.

The municipality was established on 10 March 2017, when Government of Nepal restricted all old administrative structure and announced 744 local level units as per the new constitution of Nepal 2015.

Tripurakot, Sunhu, Lhan, Pahada and Likhu Village development committees were incorporated to form this new municipality. The headquarters of the municipality is situated at Tripurakot.

Demographics
At the time of the 2011 Nepal census, 55.8% of the population in Tripurasundari Municipality spoke Nepali, 22.3% Thangmi, 18.2% Newar, 2.6% Tamang, 0.6% Sherpa and 0.2% Maithili as their first language; 0.3% spoke other languages.

In terms of ethnicity/caste, 26.2% were Thami, 25.6% Newar, 25.4% Chhetri, 4.8% Hill Brahmin, 3.9% Kami, 3.8% Gurung, 2.7% Tamang, 2.1% Pahari, 1.7% Damai/Dholi and 3.8% others.

In terms of religion, 92.7% were Hindu, 3.3% Buddhist, 2.2% Christian and 1.8% Prakriti.

References

External links
 http://www.tripurasundarimundolpa.gov.np/
 https://www.citypopulation.de/php/nepal-mun-admin.php?adm2id=6208

Populated places in Dolpa District
Municipalities in Karnali Province
Nepal municipalities established in 2017